Ignat is a Slavic given name that corresponds to the given name Ignatius. Notable persons with that name include:

Ignat Bednarik (1882–1963), Romanian painter
Ignat Dameika (1802–1889), Belarusian geologist, mineralogist and educator
Ignat Damyanov (born 1987), Bulgarian footballer
Ignat Dishliev (born 1987), Bulgarian footballer
Ignat Herrmann (1854–1935), Czech novelist, satirist and editor
Ignat Kaneff (1926–2020), Bulgarian-born Canadian business magnate and philanthropist
Ignat Kovalev ( 1990s), Russian sprint canoeist
Ignat Malei (born 1992) Belarusian track cyclist
Ignat Nekrasov, leader of the Nekrasov Cossacks who fled to the Kuban in September 1708
Ignat Pakhotin, actor playing Boris Bannon in My Spy Family, a live action family comedy series
Ignat Solzhenitsyn (born 1972), Russian-American conductor and pianist
Ignat Zemchenko (born 1992), Ukrainian-Russian ice hockey player

See also
Saint-Ignat, commune in the Puy-de-Dôme department in Auvergne in central France
Pârâul lui Ignat, tributary of the Costeşti River in Romania
Ignata, a genus of butterflies in the family Lycaenidae
Ignatenko
Ignatia (disambiguation)
Ignatov
Ignatovo
Ignatyev
Ignatz
Ignatów (disambiguation)

Bulgarian masculine given names
Russian masculine given names